Upper Otay Reservoir, also called Upper Otay Lake, is a 20-acre artificial lake in San Diego County, California. It was created in 1959 as a hatchery for the propagation and introduction of Florida Largemouth bass. The reservoir has been open to the public since 1996. In addition to fishing, the site was popular among waterfowl hunters until it was closed to hunting in 2002.

In 2014, the City of San Diego Public Utilities Department, together with the non-profit group Rivers Partners, began restoring the reservoir. The $1.2 million project focused on approximately 100 acres, including five small streams that make up the reservoir's watershed.

See also
 List of dams and reservoirs in California
 List of lakes in California

References

Reservoirs in San Diego County, California
Reservoirs in California
Reservoirs in Southern California